Ronald Samuel Marshall Lay (18 February 1917 – 9 November 1996) was an English cricket umpire.

Lay began as an umpire in club matches across Northamptonshire, before officiating in matches in the Minor Counties Championship from 1950. He first officiated in first-class cricket in 1953, standing in the match between Northamptonshire and Scotland at Peterborough. He was appointed to the first-class list of umpires in 1956 and proceeded to stand in 303 first-class matches between 1956 and 1968, predominantly in the County Championship. He additionally stood in 12 List A one-day matches between 1963 and 1968. He missed part of the 1964 season after being struck on the foot and injured by a ball which had been straight driven by Ted Dexter. Lay died at Northampton in November 1996.

References

External links
Ron Lay at Cricket Archive 

1917 births
1996 deaths
English cricket umpires